Digitaria ischaemum is a species of crabgrass known by the common names smooth crabgrass and small crabgrass. It is native to Europe and Asia, but it is known throughout much of the warm temperate world as an introduced species and often a common roadside and garden weed. It is an annual grass producing an inflorescence with two or more narrow branches lined with tiny spikelets.

It is easily confused with other members in the genus, particularly southern crabgrass in California which differs by having spikelets of nearly twice the length. It may also be confused with Bermuda Grass, but differs in being a much taller plant with a much longer inflorescence. The leaves on this grass often form above the base of the plant, and it is usually singular, rarely forming large clumps.

External links
 Jepson Manual Treatment
 Grass Manual Treatment
 

ischaemum
Grasses of Asia
Grasses of Europe